Gusev is an impact crater in Russia. It is located near Kamensk-Shakhtinsky in Rostov Oblast.

The crater is 3 km in diameter and its age is estimated to be 49.0 ± 0.2 million years old placing it in the Eocene. The crater is not exposed at the surface. It may have formed at the same time as the larger and nearby  Kamensk crater.

References 

Impact craters of Russia
Eocene impact craters
Landforms of Rostov Oblast